Bharta is a census village in Hoshiarpur district  in the state of Punjab, India.

Demographics
 India census, village Bharta had a population of 2000. Commonly two villages Ganeshpur & Bharta are collectively pronounced as Ganeshpur Bharta / Bharta / Bharta Ganeshpur.

References

Cities and towns in Hoshiarpur district